John Crawford William MacBryan (22 July 1892 – 14 July 1983) was an English  cricketer who played for Cambridge University and Somerset and made one almost imperceptible appearance in a Test match for England. MacBryan was also a field hockey international and won a gold medal at the 1920 Olympic Games with the Great Britain and Ireland team.

MacBryan was educated at Exeter School, where he played cricket for the school and was captain in 1911. After school he joined the Somerset Light Infantry. In 1914, a month after the outbreak of World War I, he was wounded and captured at the battle of Le Cateau, and he was a prisoner for the rest of the war. After the war he went up to Jesus College, Cambridge, where he won his blue for cricket in 1920.

An amateur and a right-hand batsman, MacBryan was the leading Somerset batsman in the years after the World War I and was called up for the Old Trafford Test match against the South Africans in 1924. But the match was ruined by rain, and MacBryan remains the only Test cricketer who neither batted, bowled nor dismissed anyone in the field  (where he spent 66.5 overs). His chance never came again.

He was a Wisden Cricketer of the Year in 1925.

See also
One Test Wonder

References

External links
 

dataOlympics profile for field hockey

1892 births
1983 deaths
Cambridge University cricketers
English cricketers
English male field hockey players
English Olympic medallists
England Test cricketers
Somerset cricketers
Wisden Cricketers of the Year
Olympic field hockey players of Great Britain
British male field hockey players
Field hockey players at the 1920 Summer Olympics
Olympic gold medallists for Great Britain
Free Foresters cricketers
Marylebone Cricket Club cricketers
Gentlemen cricketers
West of England cricketers
Medalists at the 1920 Summer Olympics
People educated at Exeter School
Somerset Light Infantry officers
British World War I prisoners of war
Alumni of Jesus College, Cambridge
S. B. Joel's XI cricketers
English cricketers of 1919 to 1945
H. D. G. Leveson Gower's XI cricketers
C. I. Thornton's XI cricketers
L. G. Robinson's XI cricketers
Olympic medalists in field hockey